EP7 is the seventh EP by the electronic music group Autechre, released by Warp Records on 7 June 1999. It is classified as an EP by the band despite being long enough to qualify as an album. The record was released in two parts on vinyl, named EP7.1 and EP7.2. The name of this EP prompted Warp Records to give the name LP5 to the previously released untitled album by the band.

The fractal on the cover was designed with a circuit board designer. The minisite created by Warp also featured a fractal generator that would create new artwork similar to that featured throughout the liner notes.

Reception

EP7 received mixed to positive reviews.  Ryan Screiber of Pitchfork Media said the album's primary problem was a "lack of diversity" and that the tracks "[offer] very little in the way of originality".

Track listing
The original UK CD pressing includes a hidden track in the pregap. The track, which can be accessed by rewinding from the beginning of "Rpeg", is 6:44 in duration and is followed by 3:01 of silence. Some CD players do not handle the trick, and may skip "Rpeg" because of it. The hidden track was not included on the US release nor on vinyl. The hidden track is included on Autechre's EPs 1991–2002 box set, with the CD version retaining the track's pregap placement. In 2010, Pitchfork Media included the EP7 hidden track in their list of "ten unusual CD-era gimmicks."

References

1999 EPs
Autechre EPs
Warp (record label) EPs